Bryan Camilo Reyes Silva (born 17 August 1992) is a Colombian footballer that currently plays for Audax Italiano in the Primera División de Chile.

External links
 
 

1992 births
Living people
Colombian footballers
Colombian expatriate footballers
Expatriate footballers in Chile
Chilean Primera División players
Primera B de Chile players
Tigres F.C. footballers
Audax Italiano footballers
San Luis de Quillota footballers
Association football midfielders
People from Cúcuta